Pterocaulon pycnostachyum, with the common names dense-spike blackroot, fox-tail blackroot or coastal blackroot, is a plant species native to Alabama, Mississippi, North Carolina, Florida, Georgia, and South Carolina. It can be found in pinelands, ditches, depressions, and fields.

Pterocaulon pycnostachyum is a perennial herb up to 80 cm (31 inches) tall. Stems and the underside of leaves are covered with a thick, white layer of woolly hairs. Flower heads are crowded into a densely packed spike at the tips of the branches. Each head has as many as 50 small yellowish flowers. The plant is monoecious, meaning that some of the flowers have male stamens, while female pistils are in separate flowers in the same head.

References

pycnostachyum
Flora of the Southeastern United States
Taxa named by André Michaux
Plants described in 1803